The 1999 Parapan American Games, officially the I Pan American Games, was a major international multi-sport event for athletes with disabilities that took place in Mexico City, Mexico. Organized by the International Paralympics Committee, it marked the first official Parapan American Games. Over 1,000 athletes from 18 countries competed in the games. The games served as a qualifier for the 2000 Summer Paralympics, as gold-medal winners at Mexico 1999 secured a place at Sydney 2000. These Parapan American Games were held in the same year but at a different location than the 1999 Pan American Games, which were hosted in Winnipeg, Canada.

The Games

Participating nations 
18 nations competed at the Games.

Sports

Medal table

1999 Pan American Games, Winnipeg, Canada 
The 1999 Pan American Games were hosted in Winnipeg, rather than in Mexico City.

References 

 
Parapan American Games
Parapan American Games
Parapan American Games, 1999
Parapan American Games
Parapan American Games
Parapan American Games, 1999
Parapan American Games